Rens Vis (4 July 1904 – 8 March 1993) was a Dutch footballer. He played in one match for the Netherlands national football team in 1926.

Biography
Vis played football for HVV and gained one cap for the Netherlands national team on 31 October 1926, in the 3–2 friendly loss against Germany. He was also part of the squad for the 1928 Summer Olympics but did not play. Vis also played cricket at HVV.

In 1930, Vis moved to the Dutch East Indies. In February 1949, while acting as administrator of the company Pasawahan in the Banjar Region, he was kidnapped together with his staff by the Indonesian National Armed Forces.

References

External links
 

1904 births
1993 deaths
Dutch footballers
Netherlands international footballers
Place of birth missing
Association football forwards